Stancil is both a given name and surname. Notable people with the name include:

 Felicia Stancil (born 1995), American bicyclist
 Stancil Johnson (1933–2021), psychiatrist and frisbee enthusiast
 T. J. Stancil (born 1982), football player

See also
 Stancils Chapel, North Carolina